Senator Mosher may refer to:

Charles Adams Mosher (1906–1984), Ohio State Senate
Lafayette F. Mosher (1824–1890), Oregon State Senate
Orville W. Mosher (1853–1933), Wisconsin State Senate

See also
Harold G. Mosier (1889–1971), Ohio State Senate